Laurențiu Daniel Rus (born 7 May 1985) is a former Romanian professional footballer, currently a fitness coach at FC Argeș Pitești. He was a versatile player, being able to play as a right winger, a midfielder or a right back.

Club career

Although Rus is a youth product of Universitatea Cluj, he never played a league game for his home town club. In 2004 he moved to Liga II club Liberty Oradea. For the 2006–07 season, Rus was loaned to Hungarian first league club Sopron and for the second part of the 2007–08 season he was loaned to Petrolul Ploiești.

Dinamo București

In the summer of 2009, after impressing in the Romanian second legue with Liberty Oradea, Rus moved to Liga I club Dinamo București. After putting in some solid displays, he immediately established himself in the starting eleven for the 2011–12 season. For the 2013–14 Liga I campaign, Rus became captain of Dinamo București. In July 2014, after not coming to an agreement over his wages with Dinamo, he terminated his contract by mutual consent with the Bucharest club.

CFR Cluj
On 20 August 2016, after ending his stay at Voluntari, Rus moved to Romanian giants CFR Cluj and subsequently signed a two-year deal with them. In his second year with CFR Cluj, Rus managed to win the Liga I for the first time in his career.

Politehnica Iași
On 7 July 2018, Rus moved to fellow Liga I side Politehnica Iași, after agreeing to a one-year contract.

CSM Reşiţa
On 9 January 2020, Rus joined Liga II side CSM Reşiţa.

Career statistics

Club

Honours
Liberty Salonta
Divizia B: 2005–06
Dinamo București
Cupa României: 2011–12
Supercupa României: 2012
CFR Cluj
Liga I: 2017–18

References

External links
 
 

1985 births
Living people
Sportspeople from Cluj-Napoca
Romanian footballers
Association football midfielders
Association football defenders
Liga I players
Liga II players
Liga III players
Nemzeti Bajnokság I players
CF Liberty Oradea players
FC Sopron players
FC Petrolul Ploiești players
FC Dinamo București players
ASA 2013 Târgu Mureș players
FC Astra Giurgiu players
FC Voluntari players
CFR Cluj players
FC Politehnica Iași (2010) players
CSM Reșița players
FC Universitatea Cluj players
Romanian expatriate footballers
Romanian expatriate sportspeople in Hungary
Expatriate footballers in Hungary